Thuli is a South-African given name that may refer to

Thuli Brilliance Makama, Eswatini environmental attorney
Thuli Dumakude, South African-born singer-songwriter and actress
Thuli Dladla, Eswatini politician and diplomat 
Thuli Madonsela (born 1962), South African advocate 
Thuli Qegu (born 1987), South African netball player

See also
Tuli (name)